O. ferruginea may refer to:
 Olea ferruginea, a synonym for Olea europaea subsp. cuspidata, a tree species
 Orthemis ferruginea, the roseate skimmer, a dragonfly species
 Oxyura ferruginea, the ruddy duck, a bird species

See also
 Ferruginea (disambiguation)